Morteni is a commune in Dâmbovița County, Muntenia, Romania with a population of 3,061 people. It is composed of two villages, Morteni and Neajlovu (until 1964 Cacova).

References

Communes in Dâmbovița County
Localities in Muntenia